The 1941 Harvard Crimson football team was an American football team that represented Harvard University in the Ivy League during the 1941 college football season.  In its seventh season under head coach Dick Harlow, the team compiled a 5–2–1 record and outscored opponents by a total of 70 to 43. The team was ranked No. 17 in the AP Poll released on November 10, 1941, and No. 19 in the poll released on November 24, 1941.

Harvard's Endicott Peabody won the 1941 Knute Rockne Memorial Trophy as the best collegiate lineman and was the only player to be unanimously selected by all nine official selectors as a first-team player on the 1941 All-America team. Peabody and end Loren MacKinney were also selected by the Associated Press as first-team players on the 1941 All-Eastern football team. Peabody was later inducted into the College Football Hall of Fame and served as Governor of Massachusetts.

Schedule

References

Harvard
Harvard Crimson football seasons
Harvard Crimson football
1940s in Boston